Prince Ludwig Rudolph of Hanover (Ludwig Rudolph Georg Wilhelm Philipp Friedrich Wolrad Maximilian Prinz von Hannover; 21 November 1955 – 29 November 1988) was a member of the House of Hanover and a music producer.

Early life and career
Ludwig Rudolph was born in Hanover, Lower Saxony, Germany, the third child and second son of Ernst August, Prince of Hanover, Hereditary Prince of Brunswick (1914–1987) and his wife Princess Ortrud of Schleswig-Holstein-Sonderburg-Glücksburg (1925–1980). Ludwig Rudolph was a great-great-great-great-grandson of George III of the United Kingdom and a great-grandson of Wilhelm II, German Emperor.

Ludwig Rudolph had trained to become a music producer in Los Angeles and London.

Marriage and death
Having obtained the consent of Elizabeth II by Order in Council on 15 September 1987 pursuant to the Royal Marriages Act 1772, Ludwig Rudolph, a Lutheran, married the Roman Catholic Countess Isabella Maria von Thurn und Valsassina-Como-Vercelli (born 1962 in Gmunden, Upper Austria), a former fashion model at her father's ancestral Austrian estate, Bleiburg Castle, Carinthia on 4 October 1987. She was the daughter of Count Ariprand von Thurn und Valsassina-Como-Vercelli (1925-1996), whose family, a branch of the Della Torre dynasty, ruled Milan in the 13th century, and his wife, née Princess Maria von Auersperg (born 1929). Ludwig Rudolph and Isabelle had one son:

 Prince Otto Heinrich Ariprand George Johannes Ernst August Vinzenz Egmont Franz of Hanover (born 13 February 1988)

In the early hours of 29 November 1988, after the couple had entertained guests at their home, Königinvilla (The Queen's Villa) in Gmunden, a house left to them by Ludwig's brother Ernst August, the prince went to the bedroom where his wife had retired before midnight, and found Isabelle sprawled fully dressed across their bed. The efforts of her husband and friends to revive her proved futile. As authorities later removed her body and investigated the scene, discovering syringes, cocaine and heroin, Ludwig Rudolph, who had been investigated previously on suspicion of illegal drug purchases, placed a call to his elder brother, Ernst August, in London, imploring him to take care of the couple's 10-month-old son. Then he slipped away. Several hours later Ludwig Rudolph was found near his family's hunting lodge several miles away, on Lake Traun. He was in his car with the motor running. He had the muzzle of a rifle in his mouth and was dead of a gunshot wound.

The case was closed without further investigation. Ludwig Rudolph and Isabelle were interred on 2 December 1988 at Grünau im Almtal, Austria, having been married less than 14 months. Custody of their infant son Otto Heinrich was awarded, contrary to the expressed wishes of Ludwig Rudolph, to the child's maternal grandparents. He grew up at their castle, Schloss Bleiburg, in Austria, and then studied art at Braunschweig University of Art in Brunswick (Braunschweig). He lives with his maternal grandmother in Salzburg.

Ancestry

References

House of Hanover
1955 births
1988 deaths
Suicides by firearm in Austria
Nobility from Hanover
Hanoverian princes
German record producers
1988 suicides